Řež is a village and administrative part of Husinec in the Central Bohemian Region of the Czech Republic.

Řež is the site of a nuclear research centre and a chemical factory. In August 2002 there was a serious flood which damaged the site.

Řež has a railway connection by Prague - Kralupy nad Vltavou line. The stop is located on the opposite (left) bank of the Vltava River and is accessible by a pedestrian bridge.

On 19 June 2022 the highest ever temperature during the month of June in the Czech Republic was recorded here at 39.0 °C.

Further reading

1995. 40 Years on: Rez Institute Underpins Czech Programme. "Nuclear Engineering International". no. 491: 46.

References

External links

Official website of Husinec

Villages in Prague-East District